The Wainuiomata Lions are a New Zealand rugby league club based in Wainuiomata, Wellington. They compete in the Wellington Rugby League competition.

In the early 1990s, prior to the creation Lion Red Cup national league competition based on provincial teams, Wainuiomata was one of the strongest rugby league teams in New Zealand. They made the final of the 1989 national club competition but went down 10–4 to Northcote. They returned to Carlaw Park the following year to beat Otahuhu 34–12 to win the 1990 title.

A match was also organised against the Manly Sea-eagles team played at Fraser Park, Lower Hutt in January 1991.  Manly, featuring stars such as Matthew Ridge, were the victors 20 points to 8.

In 1992 Wainuiomata beat Northcote 25–18 to again win the national club championship.

Notable players

Notable past players include:
 Ali Davys
 David Faiumu
 Jason Gilbert
 Marvin Karawana
 Ken Laban
 Arnold Lomax
 David Lomax 
 John Lomax
 Tony Lomax
 Heston Patea
 Yogi Rogers
 Ava Seumanufagai
 Tana Umaga
 Earl Va’a
 Billy Weepu
 Piri Weepu
 Paul Whatuira

Bartercard Cup
Between 2000 and 2001 they competed in the national Bartercard Cup competition before being replaced by the Wellington Orcas.

References

New Zealand rugby league teams
Sport in Lower Hutt
Rugby league in Wellington